The Norse–Gaels ('foreigner-Gaels') were a people of mixed Gaelic and Norse ancestry and culture. They emerged in the Viking Age, when Vikings who settled in Ireland and in Scotland became Gaelicised and intermarried with Gaels. The Norse–Gaels dominated much of the Irish Sea and Scottish Sea regions from the 9th to 12th centuries. They founded the Kingdom of the Isles (which included the Hebrides and the Isle of Man), the Kingdom of Dublin, the Lordship of Galloway (which is named after them), and briefly (939–944 AD) ruled the Kingdom of York. The most powerful Norse–Gaelic dynasty were the Uí Ímair or House of Ivar.

Over time, the Norse–Gaels became ever more Gaelicised and disappeared as a distinct group. However, they left a lasting influence, especially in the Isle of Man and Outer Hebrides, where most placenames are of Norse–Gaelic origin. Several Scottish clans have Norse–Gaelic roots, such as Clan MacDonald, Clan MacDougall and Clan MacLeod. The elite mercenary warriors known as the gallowglass emerged from these Norse–Gaelic clans and became an important part of Irish warfare. Norse–Gaelic surnames survive today and include MacIvor, MacAskill and (Mac)Cotter.

Name
The meaning of Gall-Goídil is "foreigner Gaels" or "foreign Gaels" and although it can in theory mean any Gael of foreign origin, it always was used of Gaels (i.e. Gaelic-speakers) with some kind of Norse identity. This term is subject to a large range of variations depending on chronological and geographical differences in the Gaelic language, e.g. Gall Gaidel, Gall Gaidhel, Gall Gaidheal, Gall Gaedil, Gall Gaedhil, Gall Gaedhel, Gall Goidel, Gall Ghaedheil, etc. The modern term in Irish is Gall-Ghaeil or Gall-Ghaedheil, while the Scottish Gaelic is Gall-Ghàidheil.

The Norse–Gaels often called themselves Ostmen or Austmen, meaning East-men, a name preserved in a corrupted form in the Dublin area known as Oxmantown which comes from Austmanna-tún (homestead of the Eastmen). In contrast, they called Gaels Vestmenn (West-men) (see Vestmannaeyjar and Vestmanna).

Other terms for the Norse–Gaels are Norse-Irish, Hiberno-Norse or Hiberno-Scandinavian for those in Ireland, and Norse-Scots or Scoto-Norse for those in Scotland.

History

The Norse–Gaels originated in Viking colonies of Ireland and Scotland, the descendants of intermarriage between Norse immigrants and the Gaels. As early as the 9th century, many colonists (except the Norse who settled in Cumbria) intermarried with native Gaels and adopted the Gaelic language as well as many Gaelic customs. Many left their original worship of Norse gods and converted to Christianity, and this contributed to the Gaelicisation.

Gaelicised Scandinavians dominated the region of the Irish Sea until the Norman era of the 12th century. They founded long-lasting kingdoms, such as the Kingdoms of Man, Dublin, and Galloway, as well as taking control of the Norse colony at York.

Ireland

The Norse are first recorded in Ireland in 795 when they sacked Lambay Island. Sporadic raids then continued until 832, after which they began to build fortified settlements throughout the country. Norse raids continued throughout the 10th century, but resistance to them increased. The Norse established independent kingdoms in Dublin, Waterford, Wexford, Cork and Limerick. These kingdoms did not survive the subsequent Norman invasions, but the towns continued to grow and prosper.

The term Ostmen was used between the 12th and 14th centuries by the English in Ireland to refer to Norse–Gaelic people living in Ireland. Meaning literally "the men from the east" (i.e. Scandinavia), the term came from the Old Norse word austr or east. The Ostmen were regarded as a separate group from the English and Irish and were accorded privileges and rights to which the Irish were not entitled. They lived in distinct localities; in Dublin they lived outside the city walls on the north bank of the River Liffey in Ostmentown, a name which survives to this day in corrupted form as Oxmantown. It was once thought that their settlement had been established by Norse–Gaels who had been forced out of Dublin by the English but this is now known not to be the case. Other groups of Ostmen lived in Limerick and Waterford. Many were merchants or lived a partly rural lifestyle, pursuing fishing, craft-working and cattle raising. Their roles in Ireland's economy made them valuable subjects and the English Crown granted them special legal protections. These eventually fell out of use as the Ostmen assimilated into the English settler community throughout the 13th and 14th centuries.

Scotland

The Lords of the Isles, whose sway lasted until the 16th century, as well as many other Gaelic rulers of Scotland and Ireland, traced their descent from Norse–Gaels settlements in northwest Scotland, concentrated mostly in the Hebrides.

The Hebrides are to this day known in Scottish Gaelic as Innse Gall, "the islands of foreigners"; the irony of this being that they are one of the last strongholds of Gaelic in Scotland.

The maclachlan clan name means ‘son of the Lakeland’ believed to be the name for Norway (the lake 
Land). It has its Scottish clan home on eastern Loch Fyne under Strathlachlan forest. The name or variations therof is common from this mid/southern Scottish area to Irish Donegal to the extreme west.

Iceland and the Faroes
It is recorded in the Landnámabók that there were papar or culdees (Gaelic monks) in Iceland before the Norse. This appears to tie in with comments of Dicuil and is given weight by recent archaeological discoveries. The settlement of Iceland and the Faroe Islands by the Norse have included many Norse–Gael settlers as well as slaves and servants. They were called Vestmen (Western men), and the name is retained in Vestmanna in the Faroes and the Vestmannaeyjar off the Icelandic mainland.

A number of Icelandic personal names are of Gaelic origin, including Njáll, Brjánn, Kjartan and Kormákur (from Niall, Brian, Muircheartach and Cormac). Patreksfjörður, an Icelandic village, was named after Saint Patrick. A number of placenames named after the papar exist on Iceland and the Faroes.

According to some circumstantial evidence, Grímur Kamban, seen as the founder of the Norse Faroes, may have been a Norse Gael.

Mythology 
Heinrich Zimmer (1891) suggested that the Fianna Cycle of Irish mythology came from the heritage of the Norse-Gaels. He suggested the name of the heroic fianna was an Irish rendering of Old Norse fiandr "enemies", and argued that this became "brave enemies" > "brave warriors". He also noted that Finn's Thumb of Knowledge is similar to the Norse tale Fáfnismál. Linguist Ranko Matasović, author of the Etymological Dictionary of Proto-Celtic, derives the name fíanna from reconstructed Proto-Celtic *wēnā (a troop), while linguist Kim McCone derives it from Proto-Celtic *wēnnā (wild ones).

Modern names and words
Even today, many surnames particularly connected with Gaeldom are of Old Norse origin, especially in the Hebrides and Isle of Man. Several Old Norse words also influenced modern Scots English and Scottish Gaelic, such as bairn (child) from the Norse barn (a word still used in Denmark, Norway, Sweden, and Iceland).

Surnames

Forenames

See also
 Caill Tomair, a sacred grove near Dublin targeted by Brian Boru in the year 1000
 Scandinavian York
 Old English (Ireland)
 Clan Donald
 Earl of Orkney
 Faroe Islanders
 Gallowglasses
 Icelanders
 Kings of Dublin
 List of rulers of the Kingdom of the Isles
 Diocese of Sodor and Man
 Galley
 Lord of the Isles
 Lords of Galloway
 Papar

References

Bibliography

External links

Norse History of Clan Gunn of Scotland

 
Medieval ethnic groups of Europe
Ethnic groups in Ireland
Ethnic groups in Scotland
Society of the Isle of Man
Kingdom of Norway (872–1397)
Viking Age in Ireland
Scandinavian Scotland